Ko Ko Oo (1961 – 9 December 2015) was a scientist, previously served as Minister for Science and Technology of Myanmar (MOST) from September 2012 to December 2015 until his death.  He received his PhD in Nuclear Physics from Osaka University, Japan. He previously served as deputy minister of MOST from March 2011 to September 2012. He was previously the director of the Department of Technical and Vocational Education (DTVE) and Director General of the Department of Atomic Energy.

References

Government ministers of Myanmar
1961 births
2015 deaths
Burmese scientists